Zingem is a village and former municipality located in the Belgian province of East Flanders. The municipality comprised the towns of Huise, Ouwegem and Zingem proper. In 2018, the municipality of Zingem had a total population of 7,552. The total area is 23.93 km2.

Effective 1 January 2019, Kruishoutem and Zingem merged into the new municipality of Kruisem.

Gallery

References

External links

 - Only available in Dutch

Former municipalities of East Flanders
Kruisem
Populated places in East Flanders